The Cuilapa-Barbarena volcanic field is a field of cinder cones in Guatemala with approximately 70 cones.
The field is located over the intersection of the local Jalpatagua fault with the Miocene Santa Rosa de Lima caldera. The youngest cones postdate the last activity phase of Tecuamburro and may be of Holocene age, but with no confirmed evidence.

References

See also
 List of volcanoes in Guatemala

Volcanoes of Guatemala
Volcanic fields